Indian Summer is the third studio album by English pop duo Go West, released in 1992. It includes the singles "King of Wishful Thinking", "Faithful", "What You Won't Do for Love" and "Still in Love". "King of Wishful Thinking" had been released as a single more than two years earlier, becoming a worldwide hit after being featured in the 1990 film Pretty Woman.

Track listing
All tracks written by Peter Cox and Richard Drummie, except where noted.

Personnel 

Go West
 Peter Cox – lead and backing vocals, drums (3), keyboards (6, 10, 11, 12), guitars (8, 13), drum programming (11, 12), keyboard solo (11), cymbals (13),  hi-hat (13)
 Richard Drummie – backing vocals (1-10, 12, 13), keyboards (1, 2, 6-13), guitars (1, 3, 4, 6, 11, 13), cymbals (2), horn arrangements (8, 9, 10), ukulele (10), drum programming (11)

Additional musicians

 Peter Wolf – keyboards (1-4, 6, 13), drum programming (1-4, 6, 13)
 Randy Kerber – acoustic piano (7, 8, 9), acoustic piano solo (8)
 Chuckii Booker – keyboards (11, 12), bass (11, 12), keyboard solo (12)
 David Williams – guitars (1, 2, 4, 6)
 Ron Fair – ukulele (2), additional arrangements (4), keyboards (5, 7-10), arrangements (5), horn arrangements (8, 9, 10)
 Benny Bigeri – guitars (4)
 John Goux – guitars (5, 8)
 Paul Jackson Jr. – guitars (7-10)
 Abraham Laboriel – bass (5, 8, 9), ukulele (8)
 Neil Stubenhaus – bass (7)
 "Ready" Freddie Washington – bass (10)
 Jeff Porcaro – cymbals (1), drums (7)
 Vinnie Colaiuta – hi-hat (2)
 Steve Dubin – drum programming (5, 8, 9, 10)
 Jon Gass – drum programming (11, 12)
 Rafael Padilla – percussion (2, 4)
 Steve Forman – percussion (5, 7-10), drum programming (7)
 Dan Higgins – saxophones (1, 5, 6, 9, 13)
 Larry Williams – saxophones (1, 6, 8, 9, 10, 13), horn arrangements (5)
 Kirk Whalum – saxophone solo (2, 3, 7, 9)
 Bill Reichenbach, Jr. – trombone (5, 9)
 Gary Grant – trumpet (1, 5, 6, 8, 9, 10, 13),
 Jerry Hey – trumpet (1, 5, 6, 8, 9, 10, 13), horn arrangements (1, 6, 13), trumpet solo (8)
 Lynn Davies – backing vocals (1, 3, 6)
 Siedah Garrett – backing vocals (1, 3)
 Phillip Ingram – backing vocals (1, 3, 6)
 Rick Nelson – backing vocals  (1, 3)
 Rose Stone – backing vocals (1, 3)
 Fred White – backing vocals (1, 3)
 Maxine Anderson – backing vocals  (2)
 Mona Lisa Young – backing vocals (2)
 Dorian Holly – backing vocals (6)
 Alfie Silas – backing vocals  (6)
 Reggie Green – backing vocals (12)
 Donnell Spencer – backing vocals (12)
 Colin Campsie – backing vocals (13)

Production 
 Producers – Peter Wolf (tracks 1–4, 6 & 13); Ron Fair (tracks 5 & 7–10); Go West and Jon Gass (tracks 11 & 12).
 Assistant producer on track 12 – Donnell Sullivan
 Executive producer – Ron Fair 
 Recording – Paul Erickson (tracks 1–4, 6 & 13), Michael C. Ross (tracks 5 & 7–10); Jon Gass (tracks 11 & 12).
 Assistant recording – Greg Grill (tracks 5 & 7–10); Donnell Sullivan (tracks 11 & 12).
 Mixing – Tom Lord-Alge (tracks 1–10); Jon Gass (tracks 11–13).
 Mix Assistant on track 12 – Donnell Sullivan
 Design – Stylorouge
 Photography – Nels Israelson
 Management – John Glover for Blueprint Management

Charts

Certifications

References

1992 albums
Go West (band) albums
Albums produced by Peter Wolf
Albums produced by Ron Fair
Chrysalis Records albums